Firestorm Books & Coffee is a worker-owned and self-managed "anti-capitalist business" in Asheville, North Carolina. Named after the firestorm, this infoshop operates with an eye on creating a sustainable, radical community event space. Firestorm features regular events, such as film screenings, political and economic teach-ins, local and traveling musicians and community workshops.

Firestorm opened in May 2008, spearheaded by co-creators Libertie Valance  and is run by an LGBTQ collective.

History
In May 2010, Firestorm was named the "#2 Best Slow Money Business in America" by the Slow Money Alliance. In December 2011, Firestorm was featured in a list of the "10 Coolest Independent Coffee Shops Across the US" surveyed by Zagat, a U.S. publisher of popular restaurant guides.

In January 2014, the Firestorm Collective announced that they would be closing the downtown space and looking for a new location in West Asheville. Firestorm was closed from March 2014 to July 2015. In July 2015, the collective officially opened the new space on Haywood Road in West Asheville, under the name Firestorm Books & Coffee. The name change reflected the expanded focus on operating as a bookstore.

In August 2018, Firestorm was cited by the City of Asheville for hosting a regular needle exchange event that included the distribution of clean syringes and naloxone. The city alleged that they were operating in violation of zoning code. The violations were later dropped without disruption to the activities originally cited on conditions that the site maintained a medical personnel on site.

Firestorm has hosted many notable speakers, including economist Thomas Greco, gay activist Wayne Besen, the Beehive Collective, environmental scholar Kirkpatrick Sale, activist educator Bill Ayers, and feminist organizer Jenny Brown.

Structure
Firestorm is owned and operated by the Firestorm Collective, a cooperative body that uses formal consensus decision-making and job complexes to equitably distribute labor and responsibility. In keeping with its identity as an anti-capitalist business, Firestorm is committed to operation without profit, returning 100% of would-be profits to the community.

See also
 List of anarchist communities

References

External links
 Firestorm.coop, official website
 AshevilleLETS.org, official website

Coffeehouses and cafés in the United States
Infoshops
Worker cooperatives of the United States
Buildings and structures in Asheville, North Carolina
Anarchist bookstores
2008 establishments in North Carolina
Independent bookstores of the United States